Bugs Bunny & Taz: Time Busters is a Looney Tunes platform video game released for the Sony PlayStation and Microsoft Windows in 2000, and is an indirect sequel to the 1999 game Bugs Bunny: Lost in Time. It also came on a Twin Pack CD bundled with Wacky Races in 2003.

Plot 
While on duty as the top pest controller for "Jet Age Pest Control," Daffy Duck accidentally breaks Granny's Time Regulator and is thrown back in time with the core of this machine, a precious Time Gem. The time regulator goes haywire, hurtling various residents of different eras in time across time and space, and the gears that help the regulator function are scattered as well. Bugs Bunny arrives at Granny's house, and is tasked with finding the Time Gem, the gears, the lost characters, and Daffy with Granny's pet Taz. Bugs and Taz solve various puzzles and battle local villains, many of whom Daffy has run afoul of due to greedily trying to steal their riches.

The game features two possible endings upon the defeat of the final boss, Count Bloodcount. If the player has not collected all the Time Regulator's gears by the time they defeat Bloodcount, Granny asks the player to return to the game to retrieve the remaining gears; if the player refuses, Granny accepts the Time Regulator not working perfectly, and Daffy is left in the Transylvanian Era to be killed and eaten by Count Bloodcount. If the player either agrees to return to collect the remaining gears and succeeds, or has already collected them all by the time they defeat Bloodcount, Granny fully repairs the Time Regulator and rescues Daffy from Bloodcount. The gateways to the various eras are then sealed off forever, and Daffy returns to the present shrunken to insect size.

Gameplay 
The object of the game is to collect all the gears scattered around the levels and progress through all five different eras. The gameplay plays much the same as Bugs Bunny: Lost in Time, retaining Bugs' traits, but introducing new ones to Taz, as well as a co-op mode where one player can control Bugs, with the other controlling Taz; alternatively, the game can be played single-player, with the player having to switch between controlling Bugs and Taz throughout the game. Both characters need to be used to make use of their unique abilities to make areas accessible and defeat certain enemies.

All Eras are accessed from the central hub level Granwich. Once an era has been completed of its levels, a boss must be confronted and defeated, along with collecting nearly all of the current era's gears, in order to unlock the next era. After the last era is completed, the player is given two different endings based on if all gears were collected. If all gears are not collected, the player can choose to continue playing to collect the remaining gears.

Reception 

The game was met with fairly positive reception upon release. GameRankings and Metacritic gave it a score of 74.95% and 72 out of 100 for the PlayStation version, and 70% for the PC version. Frank Provo, writing for GameSpot, gave the game a score of 7.5/10, writing that "it does an excellent job of capturing the humor and personality that the Looney Tunes franchise embodies."

References

External links 
 

2000 video games
Cooperative video games
3D platform games
Video games about time travel
PlayStation (console) games
Windows games
Infogrames games
Video games with alternate endings
Video games featuring Bugs Bunny
Video games featuring the Tasmanian Devil (Looney Tunes)
Behaviour Interactive games
Video games developed in Canada
Video games set in Mexico
Video games set in Northern Europe
Video games set in Saudi Arabia
Video games set in Transylvania
Video games set in the Viking Age
Warner Bros. video games
Aztecs in fiction
Multiplayer and single-player video games